Agyneta tianschanica is a species of sheet weaver found in Kyrgyzstan. It was described by Tanasevitch in 1989.

References

tianschanica
Fauna of Kyrgyzstan
Spiders of Asia
Spiders described in 1989